Juffali is of Arabic origin which is commonly used as a surname in Saudi Arabia. It may refer to

Companies 
 E. A. Juffali and Brothers, Saudi Arabian company

Surname 
 Ahmed Juffali (1924 – 1994), Saudi Arabian businessman and founder of E. A. Juffali and Brothers
 Khaled Juffali (born 1958), Saudi Arabian businessman and chairman of E. A. Juffali and Brothers
 Reema Juffali (born 1992), Saudi Arabian racing driver and first Saudi Arabian female car racing driver
 Walid Juffali (1955 – 2016), Saudi Arabian businessman and former chairman of E. A. Juffali and Brothers